Kuşçular, Nazilli is a small village in the District of Nazilli, Aydın Province, Turkey. As of 2010 it had a population of 138 people.

References

Villages in Nazilli District